Berakas Sports Complex (Malay:Kompleks Sukan Berakas) is a multi-use stadium in Bandar Seri Begawan, Brunei.  It is currently used mostly for football matches, Track and Field, and Tennis Tournament. The stadium holds 500 people. It is also home to Kota Ranger FC.

Alternative names for the venue are: Padang JBS(Jabatan Belia & Sukan) and Padang Kebajikan.

References

Football venues in Brunei Darussalam
Brunei
Multi-purpose stadiums